Travis Kittleson (born December 21, 1979) is an American former stock car racing driver from Merritt Island, Florida. Kittleson competed in 11 NASCAR Busch Series races between 2004 and 2009. He also competed in eight NASCAR Craftsman Truck Series events between 2007 and 2008. Kittleson also competed in the X-1R Pro Cup Series and the ASA National Tour.

Racing career

Kittleson's first two Busch Series starts came with his family R/T Racing team. He also tested with Dale Earnhardt, Inc.'s Busch Series team in 2004.

Motorsports career results

NASCAR
(key) (Bold – Pole position awarded by qualifying time. Italics – Pole position earned by points standings or practice time. * – Most laps led.)

Nationwide Series

Craftsman Truck Series

References

External links
 

1979 births
Living people
People from Merritt Island, Florida
Racing drivers from Florida
NASCAR drivers
Joe Gibbs Racing drivers